In enzymology, an UTP—hexose-1-phosphate uridylyltransferase is an enzyme that catalyzes the chemical reaction

UTP + alpha-D-galactose 1-phosphate  diphosphate + UDP-galactose

Thus, the two substrates of this enzyme are UTP and alpha-D-galactose 1-phosphate, whereas its two products are diphosphate and UDP-galactose.

Enzyme family
This enzyme belongs to the family of transferases, specifically those transferring phosphorus-containing nucleotide groups (nucleotidyltransferases).  The systematic name of this enzyme class is UTP:alpha-D-hexose-1-phosphate uridylyltransferase. Other names in common use include galactose-1-phosphate uridylyltransferase, galactose 1-phosphate uridylyltransferase, alpha-D-galactose 1-phosphate uridylyltransferase, galactose 1-phosphate uridyltransferase, UDPgalactose pyrophosphorylase, uridine diphosphate galactose pyrophosphorylase, and uridine diphosphogalactose pyrophosphorylase.  This enzyme participates in galactose metabolism and nucleotide sugars metabolism.

Structural studies

References

 
 
 
 

EC 2.7.7
Enzymes of known structure